Luis Enrique Yarur Rey (born c. 1951) is a Chilean heir and banker. He serves as the chairman of Banco de Crédito e Inversiones. He is the vice chairman of the Chilean Banking Association. As of December 2016, he is worth an estimated US$1.34 billion according to Forbes.

References

Living people
1950s births
People from Santiago
University of Navarra alumni
Chilean bankers
Chilean people of Palestinian descent
Chilean billionaires
Luis Enrique